Between Hamburg and Haiti is a 1940 German drama film directed by Erich Waschneck and starring Gustav Knuth, Gisela Uhlen and Albert Florath. A German plantation owner rescues a young German woman who has been abandoned by her lover in Latin America.

The film's sets were designed by Ernst H. Albrecht. Location shooting took place in Hamburg.

Cast
 Gustav Knuth as Henry Brinkmann
 Gisela Uhlen as 'Bella' Anna Wittstock
 Albert Florath as Wilm
 Walter Franck as Melchior Schlömpp alias Larsen
 Ruth Eweler as Ingeborg
 Kurt Waitzmann as Gustav Petersen
 Grethe Weiser as Kitty
 Walter Lieck as Hermann Polt
 Will Dohm as Miguel Braga
 Anneliese Kressel as Rosita
 Lea Niako as Dolores
 Michael Simo as Tänzer
 Siegfried Drost
 Erich Dunskus as Mexikanischer Hotelportier
 Angelo Ferrari as Angestellter im mexikanischen Hotel
 Bernhard Goetzke
 Erich Hecking
 Otto Kronburger
 Peter C. Leska
 Eduard Marks
 Manfred Meurer as Manuel
 Karl-Heinz Peters as Jackson
 Leo Peukert as Der deutsche Geschäftsfreund Miguels
 Ernst Rotmund
 Hans Adalbert Schlettow
 Annemarie Schreiner as Chinita
 Franz Schönemann
 Wolf Trutz
 Ernst Weiser
 Herbert Weissbach as Gast im 'Goldenen Hufeisen'
 Manny Ziener

References

Bibliography

External links 
 

1940 films
1940 drama films
German drama films
Films of Nazi Germany
1940s German-language films
Films directed by Erich Waschneck
Films based on German novels
Films set in Hamburg
Films shot in Hamburg
Films set in Haiti
Films set in Mexico
UFA GmbH films
German black-and-white films
1940s German films